Wiśniowa  is a village in Strzyżów County, Subcarpathian Voivodeship, in south-eastern Poland. It is the seat of the gmina (administrative district) called Gmina Wiśniowa.

The village has a population of 1,826.

References

Villages in Strzyżów County